Luohuan Ylipää is a village in Siikajoki, Northern Ostrobothnia region of Finland.

References

Villages in Finland
Siikajoki